Tephrialia is a genus of moths of the family Erebidae. The genus was erected by George Hampson in 1926.

Species
Tephrialia glyptalis Mabille
Tephrialia trigonospila Hampson, 1910

References

Calpinae